is a Japanese actor. He is represented by Triple A.

Biography
Motomiya's elder brother is Ryuji Harada, also an actor. His wife is tarento Akiko Matsumoto.

Motomiya was scouted after his older brother entered the entertainment industry and debuted in 1994 Spur wa Yukue Fumei (Nippon TV). Contrary to Harada's brother, Harada who often plays a good role, he often plays a villain, a suspicious person, or a role to be killed.

Motomiya's son is a big fan of Heisei Kamen Rider series and his was playing with his son and a rider (a monster), so he volunteered for "my son will be delighted" and appeared in Kamen Rider Blade. By the way, when he was appearing on this programme, he said that he did harassment, such as hiding shoes against the cast of the role of the rider, and made a role by doing "hatred efforts".

Motomiya's special skills are kendo, MMA fighting, boxing, and baseball.

Filmography

TV dramas

Films

Direct-to-video

See also
List of Japanese actors

References

External links
 – Triple A 
Yasukaze Motomiya Profile-Photos-Images - goo News 

Male actors from Tokyo
1972 births
Living people